Nitor is a genus of air-breathing land snails, terrestrial pulmonate gastropod molluscs in the family Helicarionidae.

Species
Species within the genus Nitor include:

 Nitor circumcincta 
 Nitor helmsianus Iredale, 1941
 Nitor medioximus Iredale, 1941
 Nitor moretonensis - Moreton land snail
 Nitor pudibunda (Cox, 1868)
 Nitor subrugata (Reeve, 1852)
 Nitor wiangariensis Hyman, 2007 - Wiangarie Forest Glass Snail

References

External links 
 https://biodiversity.org.au/afd/taxa/Nitor

Helicarionidae